The 1934 Michigan State Spartans football team represented Michigan State College as an independent during the 1934 college football season. In their second season under head coach Charlie Bachman, the Spartans compiled an 8–1 record, outscored opponents by a total of 153 to 56, and won their annual rivalry game with Michigan by a 16 to 0 score. In inter-sectional play, the team defeated Carnegie Tech (13–0), Manhattan (39–0), Kansas (6–0), and Texas A&M (26–13), but lost to Syracuse (10–0).

Key players include Kurt Warmbein at left halfback, Art Brandstetter Sr. at fullback, Russ Reynolds at quarterback and Ed Klewicki at end.
Warmbein was selected as the 1934 Man of the Year among football players in Michigan.

Schedule

References

Michigan State
Michigan State Spartans football seasons
Michigan State Spartans football